The Slovenian military ranks are the military insignia used by the Slovenian Armed Forces.

Commissioned officer ranks
The rank insignia of commissioned officers.

Other ranks
The rank insignia of non-commissioned officers and enlisted personnel.

References

External links
 

Military of Slovenia
Slovenia